Ternate can refer to:

 Ternate, an island city in North Maluku, Indonesia
 Ternate language, a North Halmahera language spoken on the island of Ternate
 Ternate people, a North Moluccan ethnic group
 Ternate Malay or North Moluccan Malay, a Malay-based creole language
 Sultanate of Ternate based on the Indonesian island of Ternate
 Ternate, Cavite, a municipality in the Philippines
 Ternate, Lombardy, a municipality in Italy
 Ternate (1801 EIC ship), a 16-gun brig of the Bombay Marine that served the British East India Company from 1801 to c. 1838.
 Ternate (or trifoliate) leaf structure, such as clover or poison ivy